The Singapore-Cambridge General Certificate of Education Ordinary Level (or Singapore-Cambridge GCE O-Level) is a GCE Ordinary Level examination held annually in Singapore and is jointly conducted by the Ministry of Education (MOE), Singapore Examinations and Assessment Board (SEAB) and the University of Cambridge Local Examinations Syndicate (UCLES).

Despite the engagement of an identical examination board as partnering authority, the Singapore-Cambridge GCE Ordinary Level examination have no relation to the British GCSE examinations, having de-linked since 2006 when the Ministry of Education (MOE) took over the management of its national examination. This is owing to the stark differences in the development of the respective education systems in the two countries. Nevertheless, the qualification is recognised internationally as equivalent to the International General Certificate of Secondary Education (IGCSE), taken by international candidates including Singaporean students who take the exam as private candidates, as well as the General Certificate of Secondary Education (GCSE) examination taken by students in the United Kingdom.

The national examination is taken by secondary school students at the end of their fourth year (for Express stream) or fifth year (for Normal Academic stream), and is open to private candidates. Recent studies show that approximately 30,000 students take the Singapore-Cambridge GCE O-Level exams annually.

Syllabus
Examined subjects taken in English and international languages are set and marked by the University of Cambridge Local Examinations Syndicate (UCLES), with the standards and grading for the subjects determined by SEAB and MOE in consultation with the Cambridge Assessment International Examinations (CIE), a subsidiary of UCLES. Localised subjects, including Mother Tongue subjects such as Chinese, Malay and Tamil and Combined Humanities (Social Studies) are set, marked and graded locally by the Singapore Ministry of Education (MOE).

After the examination, standard papers (excluding the specified localised papers) are sent to Cambridge Assessment International Examinations (CIE) board (in Britain) for marking. For localised papers, the personal details of the student are omitted with the use of the Integrated Examination System where bar-code labels are used. Local teachers would not be able to recognise scripts from students of his or her own school as the candidates' names are neither written on the papers nor printed on the labels, hence preventing malpractice of teachers.

Grades
Candidates are graded based on their performance relative to the cohort. A grade in one GCE exam subject consists of a number and an accompanying letter. In descending order of achievement, the grades are: A (1,2), B (3,4), C (5,6), D7, E8, and F9. A grade of C6 or better is considered an O-Level pass. Obtaining a pass in one or more subjects will lead to a Singapore-Cambridge General Certificate of Education (Ordinary Level). Candidates whose subject(s) are denoted as 'Absent'—should they be absent from any component(s) for the subject—will not have the subject listed on the certificate; this is likewise for those who obtain an F9, though it will appear on the result slip.

The grades of six or five subjects (depending on the scoring system used) taken are added to give an aggregate score known as L1R5 (one language subject and five relevant subjects), or EL1R2B2, which is a separate aggregate scoring system used for polytechnic admission. The score is calculated by adding up the numeral of each grade. For example, a candidate who scores a grade of A1 in six subjects will have an L1R5 score of six.

Subjects

Special and Express students

All Special and Express stream students are required to take a minimum of six subjects, but are allowed to take up to a maximum of nine. Students who wish to take ten subjects must obtain permission from the Ministry of Education. All Special and Express students must take the following subjects:

 English Language, including listening comprehension and an oral examination
 Mathematics
 Mother Tongue, including listening comprehension and an oral examination (except for students taking NTIL and other non-mainstream languages)
(Second Language or Literature may be taken by foreign students in lieu of Mother Tongue such as Japanese, Indonesian and Arabic)
 Combined Humanities (Compulsory Social Studies with either Elective Geography, History or Literature in English, Chinese, Malay or Tamil).
 Science (Physics, Chemistry, Biology)
 Pure Science (includes a science practical exam for candidates); and/or
 Combined Science (combinations of any two science subjects listed above, considered as one subject)

Elective Subjects
 Additional Mathematics
 Principles of Accounts (POA)
 Applied Subjects (Electronics, Computing, Drama and Exercise and Sports Science)
 Nutrition and Food Science/ Food and Nutrition ( F&N)
 Design and Technology 
 Art 
 Music
 Applied Subjects (Biotechnology, Design Studies, Media Studies, Computer Science) (only for selected schools authorised to offer the subjects)
 Pure Humanities (Geography, History, Literature in English/Chinese/Malay/Tamil)
 Religious Knowledge (Bible Knowledge, Islamic Law) 
 Foreign Languages (3rd Languages: Malay (Special Programme), Chinese (Special Programme), French, Spanish, German, Japanese, Arabic, Burmese, Thai, Indonesian)
 Economics and Business Studies (only for selected schools authorised to offer the subject)

Normal (Academic) students
Students in the Normal (Academic) stream take four to seven subjects including:
 English Language (includes listening comprehension and an oral examination)
 Mathematics (Elementary Mathematics)
 Mother Tongue (includes listening comprehension and an oral examination)
(Second Language or Literature may be taken by foreign students in lieu of Mother Tongue such as Japanese, Indonesian and Arabic)
 Combined Humanities (Compulsory Social Studies with either Elective Geography, History or Literature in English, Chinese, Malay or Tamil).
 Combined Science (combinations of any two science subjects (Biology, Chemistry & Physics), considered as one subject)

Elective Subjects
 Additional Mathematics
 Principles of Accounts
 Design and Technology
 Food and Nutrition
 Art
 Music
 Foreign Languages (3rd Languages Malay, French, German, Japanese, Arabic, Burmese, Thai, Indonesian)

Mother Tongue
The Singapore Examinations and Assessment Board (SEAB) is the examining authority for Mother Tongue subjects. The Mother Tongue paper is different from the other papers, in that it includes a "Mid-Year Examination" for written papers (i.e. Papers 1 and 2), taken on the first Monday of the June school holidays. The Oral and Listening Comprehension papers are usually taken in July, and the results for Mother Tongue are subsequently released in August. However, the candidate may opt to re-take the paper in October/November along with the other papers that the candidate has registered for, though an additional fee is payable. The November re-assessment only covers the written examinations; no re-assessment is available for the Oral and Listening Comprehension component of the examination.

The best result of the two assessments is reflected in the result slip which will be released in January the following year. In addition to the grade, it will also show the candidate's performance in the Oral/Aural Examination as Distinction (highest), Merit, Pass or Ungraded.

With effect from 2007, the use of approved electronic handheld dictionaries in O-level Chinese language composition examinations (Paper 1) has been allowed.

Social Studies
Social Studies, the compulsory subject of the two components in Combined Humanities, is used as an implicit study of National Education. The last Social Studies syllabus for GCE N and O Level was revised in 2016. There are two sections in the national examination namely, Source-based Case Study (SBCS) and Structured Response Questions (SRQ). For the SBCS section, students are required to examine and evaluate sources pertaining to three Social Studies Issues (1) Governance and Citizenship (2) Living a Diverse Society (3) Being Part of a Globalised World. For the SRQ section, students are also required to offer suggestions to address societal concerns arising from the three issues.  Apart from the government schools, specialised private institutions offers Social Studies lessons to help students develop knowledge and skills required to master the subject.

School-based Science Practical Assessment

Pure Science subjects (Physics, Chemistry and Biology) include the School-based Science Practical Assessment (SPA) for school candidates. It assesses candidates' competence in science practical skills over an appropriate period of time that the candidates is offering the subject, and forms 20% of the overall mark for the subject. While the questions are set by the Ministry of Education, the assessment is scheduled, carried out and marked by the school before submitting the scripts to the MOE. The scores for the assessment are kept confidential and are never disclosed to the candidates. The assessment is grouped into three skill sets:

Skill set 1 – Performing and Observing
Skill set 2 – Analysing
Skill set 3 – Planning

Each candidate is to be assessed only twice for each of skill sets 1 and 2 and only once for skill set 3.

In 2018, the revision of the O Level Science Syllabus will see the SPA Component being phased out and replaced by the previous one-time Practical Examinations again.

List of subjects examined 

Cambridge Subjects

O-Level School Initiated Elective (OSIE) Cambridge Subjects

Note: The above electives are applicable only for candidates from schools approved to offer the subjects.

Applied Subjects

Note: The above Applied Subjects are applicable only for candidates from schools approved to offer the subjects. Candidates registering for Applied Subjects will be charged subject fees cited by the examining agencies.

Local Subjects Examined in Chinese

Local Subjects Examined in Malay

Local Subjects Examined in Tamil

See also
Secondary education in Singapore
 Integrated Programme
 General Certificate of Secondary Education
 General Certificate of Education
 International General Certificate of Secondary Education
 Singapore-Cambridge GCE Advanced Level
 List of CIE Ordinary Level subjects
 Singapore-Cambridge GCE Normal Level

References

External links 
 Singapore-Cambridge GCE O-Level on the SEAB website

Education in Singapore